Anish Kirtesh Patel (born 26 May 1990) is an English former first-class cricketer.

Patel was born at Manchester and attended Loughborough University. While at Loughborough he made his debut in first-class cricket for Loughborough MCCU against Sussex at Hove in 2013. He played first-class cricket for Loughborough until 2015, having made six appearances. Across his six first-class matches, he scored 218 runs at an average of 24.22, with a high score of 83.

Patel played minor counties cricket for Lincolnshire, debuting against Norfolk in the 2013 Minor Counties Championship. He played minor counties cricket for Lincolnshire until 2016, making a total of seven appearances in the Minor Counties Championship, six in the minor counties one-day competition, as well as one match in the minor counties 20-over competition.

He captained England at the 2017 Indoor Cricket World Cup; his sister captained the women's team at the same competition. He runs a sports centre for indoor cricket in Birmingham. He is a distant cousin of the former New Zealand spin bowler Dipak Patel.

References

External links

1990 births
Living people
Cricketers from Manchester
Alumni of Loughborough University
English cricketers
Loughborough MCCU cricketers
Lincolnshire cricketers
English people of Indian descent
British sportspeople of Indian descent
British Asian cricketers